The 1890 Minnesota Senate election was held in the U.S. state of Minnesota on November 4, 1890, to elect members to the Senate of the 27th and 28th Minnesota Legislatures.

The Minnesota Republican Party won a plurality of seats, followed by the Minnesota Democratic Party and the Minnesota Farmers' Alliance. The new Legislature convened on January 6, 1891.

The election resulted in Republicans losing control of the Senate for the first time since 1858 when Minnesota was granted statehood.

Background 
In the late 1800s, Minnesota was one of the nation's most consistently Republican states, and conservative dominance extended to the State Senate as well. Since 1860, Republicans were the preeminent caucus in the Senate, not once losing a majority in the chamber.

That being said, in the years leading up to 1890, Minnesota had emerged as a center of the Farmers' Alliance, a progressive agrarian movement. At the 1886 election, two members of the Alliance had taken seats from the Republicans, foreshadowing the 1890 result.

It was not uncommon for local Alliance organizations to endorse members of the two major parties if their values were aligned, though it was more likely for Alliance groups to endorse known Democrats than Republicans. The same is true of the Prohibition Party and other groups.

In St. Paul, a group of 100 local power brokers, 50 from either major party, assembled in August 1890 with the intention of nominating a "Citizens' Ticket" for Ramsey County. The "committee of 100" hoped that local Democratic and Republican organizations would endorse their unity ticket, which they did in most cases.

In western Minnesota, two candidates were endorsed as the "Peoples'" candidates. It is unclear if these endorsements were related as part of a broader organization or if the "Peoples'" designation was only of local significance.

Three Republicans who lost their party's endorsement ran as Independent Republicans and won, then caucused as Republicans in the Senate. Two Democrats, one endorsed and one unendorsed, ran in the 36th District of Scott County. The endorsed candidate, James McHale, won.

Prior to the 1890 election, the Minnesota Senate had 47 seats. A redistricting undertaken in 1889 added 7 seats, bringing the total to 54. In particular, Hennepin and Ramsey Counties as well as western and northern Minnesota gained new seats. Goodhue County lost a seat.

Results

Summary 
Republicans won 26 seats, two short of the 28 needed to control the chamber. The Democratic Party and Farmers' Alliance won a combined 28 seats.

Due to the fact that numerous candidates were endorsed by more than one party, it is impossible to calculate how many people voted for each party without counting votes multiple times. It can be said, however, that Republicans had certainly not won such a small percentage of the vote since Minnesota had been granted statehood.

District results 
The parties are as follows:  (All.),  (Cit.),  (Dem.),  (Ind.),  (Lab.),  (Peo.),  (Pro.),  (Rep.)

Aftermath 
When the new legislature met in January 1891, a flurry of activity and political dealmaking led to a strange arrangement of power in St. Paul. The 1891 session opened by Republican Lieutenant Governor Gideon Ives, and was swiftly moved to recess for three hours. In this time, Ignatius Donnelly organized the Democratic and Alliance members into a caucus (known as the "Combine") with him as its leader. To the great surprise of Republicans, the caucus was able to topple all their nominations for officers of the Senate.

By custom, Lieutenant Governor Ives would each day pass the president's gavel to Republican Senator John B. Sanborn to serve as president pro tempore (i.e., temporary) of the Senate. The Combine never elected a president of their own, making Sanborn the de facto president of the Senate until the start of the 1895 session.

The result in the 23rd District of Washington County was contested in late January 1891. The originally certified results counted Republican Jasper N. Searles as the winner by 4 votes, but after a tabulation discrepancy was discovered in Marine Township, Democrat James S. O'Brien was awarded the seat by the Senate's vote of 32 to 21 on January 29, 1891. This expanded the Combine's majority to 29 over the Republicans' 25 seats.

See also 
 Minnesota gubernatorial election, 1890

Notes

References 

1890 Minnesota elections
Minnesota
Minnesota Senate elections